Ulrich Kessany Zategwa (born 16 March 1985 in Lambaréné), known as Paul Kessany, is a Gabonese former footballer who played as a defensive midfielder.

Honours
Georgian Cup (1):
2007–08

External links

1982 births
Living people
Gabonese footballers
Gabon international footballers
USM Libreville players
FC 105 Libreville players
Hapoel Ironi Kiryat Shmona F.C. players
AS Mangasport players
FC Istres players
Hapoel Ramat Gan F.C. players
Ligue 2 players
Israeli Premier League players
Liga Leumit players
Expatriate footballers in Spain
Expatriate footballers in Georgia (country)
Expatriate footballers in Israel
Expatriate footballers in France
Gabonese expatriate sportspeople in Spain
Gabonese expatriate sportspeople in Georgia (country)
Gabonese expatriate sportspeople in Israel
Gabonese expatriate sportspeople in France
People from Lambaréné
2010 Africa Cup of Nations players
Association football midfielders
21st-century Gabonese people